The following is a list of notable events and releases that happened in Scandinavian music in 2018. (Go to last year in Scandinavian music or next year in Scandinavian music.)

Events

January
 12
Norwegian singer Sigrid is named winner of the BBC's "Sound of 2018" award.
The 22nd Folklandia Cruise starts in Helsinki, Finland, running until 13 January.
 13 –  Composer Paavo Heininen, considered by many to be Finland's most influential musician, celebrates his 80th birthday with a concert at the Järvenpää Hall, Helsinki.
 19 –  The 37th annual Djangofestival starts in Oslo, Norway, to run until 20 January.
 28 –  Jazz guitarist Gustav Lundgren and his trio perform a tribute to Django Reinhardt at Stockholm Concert Hall, featuring Aurélien Trigo and Antoine Boyer.
 30 –  Danish composer Hans Abrahamsen is awarded the Léonie Sonning Music Prize 2019.

February
 10 – The 38th Dansk Melodi Grand Prix is won by "Higher Ground", performed by Rasmussen.
 14 – Norwegian singer Sigrid wins Best New Artist at the NME Awards ceremony.
 22 – It is announced that Agnes Obel has signed to Deutsche Grammophon, who will have a joint arrangement with Blue Note for North American releases.

March
 3 – At Söngvakeppnin 2018, Ari Ólafsson is selected to represent Iceland in the 2018 Eurovision Song Contest, with the song "Heim". After winning the context, Ólafsson is criticised on social media for crying on hearing the result.
 7 – Fifteen-year-old cellist Birgitta Elisa Oftestad wins the Virtuos 2018 competition and is named Norway's representative at the Eurovision Young Musicians 2018 contest.
 9 – Finnish band Nightwish begins a nine-month world tour titled Decades: World Tour, accompanying a new 2CD compilation called Decades.
 10 – The final of Melodifestivalen 2018 takes place in Friends Arena, Stockholm, Sweden.
 12 – The Finnish Radio Symphony Orchestra, under Hannu Lintu, begins a week-long series of concerts in Germany.
 25
Swedish House Mafia unexpectedly reunite for a performance at the 20th Anniversary of Ultra Music Festival in Miami, United States.
Greenlandic singer Nive Nielsen stars as "Lady Silence" in a new US horror series, The Terror, her first international TV role.

April
 27 – ABBA announce that they have recorded some new songs, the first since 1983.

May
 8 – In semi-final 1 of the Eurovision Song Contest 2018, Iceland's entry is eliminated, but Finland's Saara Aalto finishes 10th and makes it to the final. 
 10 – In semi-final 2 of the Eurovision Song Contest, Norway's entry finishes in first place, Sweden 2nd and Denmark 5th; all three countries make it to the final. 
 12 – In the Eurovision final, held in Lisbon, Sweden does best of the Scandinavian countries, finishing in 7th place.
 23 - The Bergen International Festival opens in Bergen, Norway, running until 6 June. Guest performers include Meow Meow, Selene Muñoz and Helsinki Songs.

June
 6 – The 26th Sweden Rock Festival opens in Norje, running until 9 June. The Quill are forced to withdraw the day before the festival begins, because lead singer Magnus Ekwall is recovering from emergency surgery.

July
 3 – The organizers confirm that the Nobel Peace Prize Concert, normally held after the awards ceremony in Oslo, will not take place in 2018.
 4 – The 19th Folk music festival of Siglufjordur opens in Siglufjordur, Iceland, running until 8 July.
 5 – Gregory Porter guest stars at the  2018 Kongsberg Jazzfestival in Norway.
 27 – The Uppsala Reggae Festival opens in Sweden, running until 28 July, headlined by Jimmy Cliff.

September
 5 – The Copenhagen World Music Festival opens, running until 9 September.
 6 – The Lahti Sibelius Festival opens, running until 9 September.

November
 7 – The Iceland Airwaves music festival opens, running until 10 November. Guests include Blood_Orange, Cashmere Cat and Stella Donnelly.

December
 6 – Icelandic Music Day is celebrated.

Albums released

January

February

March

April

May

June

July

August

September

October

November

December

Film and television scores

Films
Ravens (Sweden), music by Peter von Poehl

Television
 Trapped (Iceland), music by Jóhann Jóhannsson with Hildur Gudnadóttir and Rutger Hoedemaekers

Eurovision Song Contest
 Denmark in the Eurovision Song Contest 2018
 Finland in the Eurovision Song Contest 2018
 Iceland in the Eurovision Song Contest 2018
 Norway in the Eurovision Song Contest 2018
 Sweden in the Eurovision Song Contest 2018

Deaths
 1 January - Teddy Edelmann, Danish singer, 76
18 January – Javiera Muñoz, Swedish singer, 40
29 January – Asmund Bjørken, Norwegian jazz musician, 84
4 February – Leif Rygg, Norwegian folk musician, 77
5 February – Ove Stokstad, Norwegian artist and jazz musician, 78 
9 February – Jóhann Jóhannsson, Icelandic film composer, 48
3 March – Kenneth Gärdestad, pop songwriter, 69
5 March – Kjerstin Dellert, Swedish opera singer, 92 
9 March – Ole H. Bremnes, Norwegian folk singer and poet, 87
25 March – Jerry Williams, Swedish singer, 75
31 March – Frode Viken, guitarist and songwriter, D.D.E., 63
3 April – Lill-Babs, Swedish singer ("En tuff brud i lyxförpackning"), 80
20 April – Avicii (Tim Bergling), Swedish musician, DJ and record producer, 28
11 May –Mikhail Alperin, Ukrainian-born jazz pianist, member of the Moscow Art Trio, professor at the Norwegian Academy of Music, 61
26 June – Bo Nilsson, Swedish composer, 81
5 July – Bjørn Lie-Hansen, opera singer, 81
9 July – Stefan Demert, Swedish musician, 78
16 August – Benny Andersen, Danish writer and pianist, 88
21 August – Stefán Karl Stefánsson, Icelandic actor and singer (b. 1975). 
9 September – Frank Andersson, Swedish entertainer and wrestler, 62 (complications during heart surgery)
23 September – Berth Idoff, Swedish musician (Berth Idoffs), 77
30 September – Kim Larsen, Danish rock musician (Gasolin'), 72 (prostate cancer)
29 November – Erik Lindmark, vocalist and guitarist of Deeds of Flesh, 46 (sclerosis)

References

Scandinavian
Scandinavian culture